The Lourdes apparitions are several Marian apparitions reported in 1858 by Bernadette Soubirous, the 14-year-old daughter of a miller, in the town of Lourdes in southern France.

From 11 February to 16 July 1858, she reported 18 apparitions of "a Lady". Soubirous described the lady as wearing a white veil and a blue girdle; she had a golden rose on each foot and held a rosary of pearls. After initial skepticism from the local clergy, these claims were eventually declared to be worthy of belief by the Catholic Church after a canonical investigation. The apparition is known as Our Lady of Lourdes.

According to Soubirous, her visions occurred at the grotto of Massabielle, just outside Lourdes. On 16 July 1858, Soubirous visited the grotto for the last time and said: "I have never seen her so beautiful before." On 18 January 1862, the local bishop declared: "The Virgin Mary did appear indeed to Bernadette Soubirous." Soubirous was canonized a saint in 1933 by Pope Pius XI. In 1958, Pope Pius XII issued the encyclical Le pèlerinage de Lourdes ("The pilgrimage to Lourdes") on the 100th anniversary of the apparitions. Pope John Paul II visited Lourdes three times; Pope Benedict XVI visited Lourdes on 15 September 2008 to commemorate the 150th anniversary of the apparitions.

February 1858

The 1st appearance (11 February)

On Thursday, 11 February 1858, a week before Lent would begin on Ash Wednesday, 14-year-old Bernadette Soubirous was out gathering firewood with her sister Toinette and a friend at the grotto of Massabielle outside Lourdes. There, she reportedly had the first of 18 visions of what she termed "a small young lady", not in French but in the regional Occitan: uo petito damizelo, standing in a niche in the rock. Her sister and the friend stated that they had seen nothing.

On realizing that she alone, and not her companions, had seen the apparition, Soubirous asked her sister not to tell anyone what had happened. Toinette, however, was unable to keep silent, and told their mother, Louise Soubirous. Because their mother had suspected the children were lying, both girls received a beating, and Soubirous was forbidden to return to the grotto again. A few days passed and Soubirous asked for permission to go again with her siblings and the permission was granted.

The 2nd appearance (14 February)

Troubled by the notion that the apparition might represent an evil spirit, Soubirous used the holy water as a test. A further and positive reassuring sign was the apparition's beautiful bare feet; evil apparitions (even when taking human form) were believed to have cloven hooves or animal paws.

The 3rd appearance (18 February)
The Apparition did not speak until the third appearance, and therefore its identity was a matter of considerable speculation. Pious villagers Jeanne-Marie Milhet and Antoinette Peyret, on hearing Soubirous' description of the apparition, thought it was the returning spirit of one of their friends, who had died a few months before. Although not part of Catholic doctrine, the concept of the revenant was deeply rooted in Pyrenean superstition. According to tradition, revenants rarely spoke, but communicated their messages in writing, and so Milhet and Peyret furnished Soubirous with paper, a pen, and an inkpot to take with her, in case the apparition should make use of them.

On her third visit, she said that the "beautiful lady" asked her to return to the grotto every day for 15 days. At first her mother had forbidden her to go, but Soubirous persuaded her mother to allow her. Soubirous said that the lady told her that she did not promise to make her happy in this world, but in the next.

Although she spoke in Occitan, the regional language that Bernadette (whose French was poor) used, the apparition used a remarkably formal form of the language in her request: "Would you have the goodness to come here for fifteen days?". The significance of this politeness was not lost on the observers. It would be very unusual for anyone to adopt this formal form of address when speaking to a penniless, working-class peasant girl such as Bernadette.

The 4th appearance (19 February)

Armed with a lighted candle for protection, Soubirous came to the grotto. This originated the custom of carrying lighted candles to the grotto. Eight people were present including Soubirous's mother and two of her aunts, one of whom, Aunt Bernarde, was her godmother and the most influential member of her mother's family.

Soubirous's story caused a sensation with the townspeople, who were divided in their opinions on whether or not Soubirous was telling the truth. Soon a large number of people followed her on her daily journey, some out of curiosity and others who firmly believed that they were witnessing a miracle.

The 5th appearance (20 February)
Thirty people were present. Soubirous reported later that the lady had taught her a prayer, which she said every day of her life, but never wrote down or repeated to anyone. By this time, the news was spreading to other towns, and many people assumed that Soubirous's lady was the Virgin Mary.

The 6th appearance (21 February)
Over 100 people were present, and the apparition said to her: "You will pray to God for sinners." Afterwards Soubirous was interrogated by Dominique Jacomet, the police commissioner. Her father, François Soubirous, eventually assured the commissioner that the affair would cease.

The 7th appearance (23 February)

About 150 people were present. Jean-Baptiste Estrade (a tax inspector), Duffo (a court official), and the officers from the garrison were present. Soubirous said later that the lady had told her a secret, which was only for her alone; this secret was never revealed to anyone.

The 8th appearance (24 February)
About 250 people were present. The message of the lady was: "Penance! Penance! Penance! Pray to God for sinners! Kiss the ground as an act of penance for sinners!"

The 9th appearance (25 February)

Soubirous was interrogated again. The spring reportedly began to flow a day later.

The 10th appearance (27 February)
About 800 people were present.

The 11th appearance (28 February)
Over 1,000 people were present. Soubirous was questioned by Judge Ribes afterwards.

March 1858

The 12th appearance (1 March)
There were almost 1,500 people present. Local housewife Catherine Latapie, nine months pregnant, who had a paralysis of the ulnar nerve in one arm following an accident, reported regaining full movement after bathing her arm in the spring. Simultaneously, she went into labor and had to leave almost immediately to give birth. She gave an account of these events to local physician Dr. Pierre Romaine Dozous, who began to collect information on healings at the spring.

The 13th appearance (2 March)
The lady commanded Soubirous: "Go, tell the priests to come here in procession and to build a chapel here." Accompanied by her two aunts, Soubirous went to ask Father Peyramale; he forbade her to go to the grotto, and dismissed her. Peyramale had ordered the priests to have nothing to do with the grotto, for it was the general practice of the clergy to discourage religious visionaries. Soubirous was determined and returned with one of the priest's friends to ask again. After Soubirous was questioned before the parish clergy and dismissed, the parish priests could not agree on what course to take.

The 14th appearance (3 March)
Previously, Father Peyramale had told Soubirous that the requests for the procession and chapel could not be fulfilled unless and until the lady's name was known. On this occasion, Soubirous asked for the lady's name; according to Soubirous, the lady only smiled and laughed.

The 15th appearance (4 March)
Over 9,000 people were present.

The 16th appearance (25 March)

 Peyramale decided to go to Tarbes to visit the bishop. The bishop determined that Peyramale should remain away from the grotto.

April 1858

The 17th appearance (7 April)
Dr. Pierre Romaine Dozous, the town physician, originally watched the apparitions from a skeptical viewpoint. He believed Soubirous, whom he knew well, was in her right mind aside from the apparitions.

He reported:

On 8 June 1858, the mayor of Lourdes barricaded the grotto and stationed guards to prevent public access. Visitors were fined for kneeling near the grotto or talking about the grotto.

July 1858

The 18th appearance (16 July) 

This was the final appearance. Because the grotto was barricaded by the local government, Soubirous knelt outside the fence by the riverbank. "I thought I was at the Grotto, at the same distance as I was the other times. All I saw was Our Lady ... She was more beautiful than ever."

Later developments 

The grotto reopened to the public in October 1858 by order of Emperor Louis Napoleon III. Soubirous received no further apparitions after the 18th appearance (on 16 July 1858), and she did not feel any desire to visit the grotto afterwards.  The people, however, kept on visiting. In 1866, Soubirous left Lourdes to join a religious order.

Several churches were eventually built at Lourdes, including the Sanctuary of Our Lady of Lourdes and the Basilica of St. Pius X.

Soubirous was canonized as a saint by the Catholic Church in 1933.  Her Feast Day is celebrated on April 16; in France and Canada, it is celebrated on February 18. The Feast of the Apparition of Our Blessed Lady at Lourdes is celebrated on February 11.

See also
 Lourdes water
 Marian apparition
 Our Lady of Lourdes
 Sanctuary of Our Lady of Lourdes
 The Song of Bernadette, 1941 novel
 The Song of Bernadette, 1943 film
 "The Village of Saint Bernadette", 1959 song

Notes

Works cited

External links
 The Glories of Lourdes, full text of book by Justin Rousseil and Joseph Murphy (published 1909)
 The Wonders of Lourdes, full text of book by Louis Gaston de Ségur and Anna Theresa Sadlier (published 1874)
 Our Lady of Lourdes, full text of book by Henri Lasserre (published 1906)
 Pilgrimage of His Holiness John Paul II to Lourdes in 2004, at the Holy See website (archived October 2014)
 "The Apparitions of 1858", Sanctuaires Notre-Dame de Lourdes
 https://www.directfromlourdes.com/apparitions_at_lourdes

Our Lady of Lourdes
Marian apparitions
Shrines to the Virgin Mary
Pope Pius IX Mariology
Catholic Church in France
1858 in France
1858 in Christianity